The Colour Group (Great Britain) is a registered charity based in the United Kingdom. It was founded in 1940 as in interdisciplinary society concerned with all aspects of colour, such as  its measurement, perception, and reproduction. It organises monthly meetings, mainly in London, and an annual exhibition.

Arms

References

External links 
 The Colour Group website

Organizations established in 1940
Color organizations
Learned societies of the United Kingdom
Charities based in London